Oliver Boyce Greene (February 14, 1915 – July 26, 1976) was an American Independent Fundamental Baptist evangelist and author. He was saved on September 9, 1935, at the age of 20. Greene was ordained as a Baptist minister at Morgan Memorial Baptist Church in Greenville, South Carolina on July 24, 1939. Over 200,000 confessions of faith were recorded as a result of his ministry. He attended North Greenville Baptist College briefly before entering full-time ministry, conducting revival meetings in tents and in churches across the eastern United States from 1939 to 1968.

Career 
On October 8, 1956, he founded The Gospel Hour, Inc. as a Christian outreach ministry using radio, personal appearances, books and audio tapes. The radio program of his preaching was called "The Gospel Hour", which began on one station in Georgia and gradually became syndicated until the point it spanned the nation. The Gospel Hour was heard on 150 stations at the time of his death. Taped copies of the program are still aired today on the Fundamental Broadcasting Network and several other Christian radio stations including Caribbean Radio Lighthouse in St. John's, Antigua and Barbuda and the ministry's website.
 
He wrote over 100 books and brief booklets about the Bible.

Death 
Greene died of a cardiac aneurysm in 1976.

Personal life
Oliver B. Greene was married on September 10, 1939, to Aileen Hazel Collins Greene. They had three sons, Oliver Boyce Jr., Thomas and David.

Writing
 From Disgrace to Grace: The Story of the Black Sheep of a Respectable Family (1959)
 Commentary on Galatians (1962)
 The Epistle of Paul the Apostle to the Romans (1962)
 The Epistle of Paul the Apostle to the Galatians (1962)
 The Epistle of Paul the Apostle to the Ephesians (1963)
 The Epistle of Paul the Apostle to the Colossians (1963)
 The Revelation: verse by verse study (1963)
 Evangelistic Messages (1964)
   Gospel Hour Sermons (1964)
 The Epistles of Paul The Apostle to Timothy and Titus (1964)
 The Epistles of Paul the Apostle to the Thessalonians (1964)
 The Epistle of Paul the Apostle to the Hebrews (1965)
 The Epistle of Paul the Apostle to the Philippians (1965)
 The Gospel of Grace As Revealed to the Apostle Paul (1965)
 What Think Ye of Christ?: And other sermons (1965)
 The Gospel According to John, Volume 2 (1966)
 The Epistles of John (1966)
 Daniel: verse by verse study (1966)
 Heaven 
 James ...Servant of God 
 The Atonement Of Christ
 Bible Truth (1968)
 The Acts of the Apostles (1968)
 The Gospel According to John : Volume III (1968)
 Hell (1969)
 Our Saviour;: The work of our Saviour: past, present, future (1969)
 Bible Prophecy (1970)
 The Second Coming of Jesus (1971)
 The Gospel According to Matthew (1972)
 The Revelation, Verse By Verse Study (1973)
 Christ Our Sufficiency (1973)
 Three Men Who Witnessed and Walked Away From Calvary (1974)
 The Acts of the Apostles Volume 4 (1975)
 The Gospel According to Matthew (1976)

References

External links 
The Gospel Hour
More Audio Sermons by Oliver B. Greene

1915 births
1976 deaths
Southern Baptist ministers
Independent Baptist ministers from the United States
American evangelicals
American evangelists
Radio evangelists
Clergy from Greenville, South Carolina
Southern Baptist Theological Seminary alumni
American radio personalities
Critics of the Catholic Church
American temperance activists
King James Only movement
American Christian creationists
Christian fundamentalists
Converts to Baptist denominations
20th-century Baptist ministers from the United States